The Howard Ball House is a single-family home located at 1411 West St. Andrews Street in Midland, Michigan. It was listed on the National Register of Historic Places in 1989.

History
Howard Ball was an employee in the sales department at Dow Chemical Company. In 1935, he purchased a lot in a newly developed area at one end of the local golf course. Ball hired architect Alden B. Dow (his cousin) to design this house, and contractor W.R. Collinson to build it. Construction began in the summer of 1935, and was completed the next year. An addition was constructed in 1938.

Description
The Howard Ball House is a split level unit block structure, made from several rectangular elements pieced together. A corner of the living room, containing tall windows with prominent wooden mullions, projects outward toward the street. The remainder of the front of the house is a broad stucco wall, beyond which is another window grouping set behind the main elevation. Wooden fascia extends horizontally beyond the house into the carport and onto a separate garage. The garage, although a separate structure, is stylistically and visually tied to the house. A narrow window course sits above the main level at the rear of the house, and is part of the addition.

References

		
National Register of Historic Places in Midland County, Michigan
International style architecture in Michigan
Houses completed in 1935
Alden B. Dow buildings
Midland, Michigan